The FIS Alpine World Ski Championships 1941 in alpine skiing were the tenth edition of the competition, organized by the International Ski Federation (FIS), and were held on 1–9 February 1941 in Cortina d’Ampezzo, Italy. The FIS Nordic World Ski Championships 1941 were held simultaneously at the same location. Later, in 1946, the FIS canceled the results and deemed the Championships unofficial as the attendees only included Axis nationals and citizens of neutral countries: Italy, the German Reich (Austria joined Germany in 1938), Bulgaria, Finland, Sweden, Norway, Yugoslavia, Romania, Switzerland and Hungary.

Due to World War II, there was a nine year hiatus of the official competition until the 1948 Winter Olympics.

Men's competitions

Downhill

Slalom

Combined

Women's competitions

Downhill 
Many sources state that Proxauf (who in fact was Austrian) represented Switzerland, but this photo proves otherwise.

Slalom

Combined

Medal standings

References

1941 in alpine skiing
1941 in Italian sport
1941
Sport in Cortina d'Ampezzo
International sports competitions hosted by Italy
Alpine skiing competitions in Italy
February 1941 sports events